The Sunbury visitor information centre is located at 43 Macedon St, Sunbury VIC 3429. (in The old Court of Petty Sessions).

History and Tourism 
Containing much historical information pertaining to Sunbury's history, historical places in Sunbury and also Sunbury's tourist sites.
Including brochures and detailed information including: 
The Ashes and Sunbury as the birthplace of the ashes.
Harry Houdini's First Flight in Diggers Rest
The Sunbury Pop Festival
and much more.

The Sunbury visitor information centre also has a video hologram display with Firsty (Sunbury's own animated character) explaining many of Sunbury's firsts.

See also 

 Sunbury, Victoria
 The Ashes Sunbury The Birthplace of The Ashes
 Harry Houdini
 Rupertswood
 Salesian College
 Sunbury Pop Festival

External links 
 Sunbury Visitor Information Centre
 Firsty.TV
 Sunbury Family History Society

 
Visitor centers
Tourism in Victoria (Australia)
Buildings and structures in the City of Hume